Francesco Saverio Torcia (1840–1891) was an Italian painter, mostly of marine landscapes.

Biography
Torcia was born in Naples, where he completed his studies at the Royal Institute of Fine Arts of Naples; he then worked in the studio of Domenico Morelli. Among his works: A Song of Love and Idyll, exhibited at Milan, and reproduced in the Illustrazione Italiana; Smarrita. He painted genre and landscape paintings. He exhibited at Naples; Interior of the church of the Geroliminì and Vesuvius exhibited at Naples; Una marina, exhibited to Genoa, a canvas titled: Impressions of November 2nd and a Flower seller in Naples. Torcia became professor of design for schools in Naples; he lobbied to have Domenico Morelli restored to leadership posts in the Neapolitan Academy.

References

1840 births
1891 deaths
19th-century Neapolitan people
19th-century Italian painters
Italian male painters
Painters from Naples
Accademia di Belle Arti di Napoli alumni
19th-century Italian male artists